Horseshoe Plantation is an  cotton plantation located in northern Leon County, Florida and established around 1840 by Dr. Edward Bradford, a planter from Enfield, North Carolina.

It is currently owned and maintained by Frederic C. Hamilton.  Mr. Hamilton is chairman of Hamilton Groups LLC. 
Horseshoe Plantation is also a home to English Cocker Spaniels and other bird dogs.

Plantation specifics
Also see Pine Hill Plantation

The 1900s

In 1901, Clement A. Griscom, a businessman and shipping magnate from Philadelphia whose family gained much wealth after the American Civil War purchased  and plantation house in the horseshoe bend of Lake Iamonia for $5300 from R. E. Lester, the son of Capt. William Lester of Oaklawn Plantation. 
From 1902 through 1903 Griscom purchased land from heirs of Burgesstown Plantation, the Whitehead family, and many other owners retaining the "Horseshoe Plantation" name.
Griscom, an owner and breeder of Jersey cattle on his Haverford, Pennsylvania farm, 'Dolobran,' brought 75 head to Horseshoe. Griscom also fancied pecans and had  set aside for their cultivation. In 1911 There were 80 tenant farmer families at Horseshoe Plantation.
The remainder of the plantation was put to use for bobwhite quail.

On October 19, 1916, and after Clement Griscom's death, the eastern part of Horseshoe was sold to New Yorker George F. Baker, Jr. for $170,000. Baker was the son of George Fisher Baker, a wealthy financier and banker who was a financial associate of J. P. Morgan.

The western part of Horseshoe was divided into two separate plantations. Clement Grisom's son, Lloyd C. Griscom, established his  Luna Plantation, a winter residence in the east. It extended along the southern shores of Lake Iamonia westward to the Ochlockonee River. Frances C. Griscom, sister to Lloyd, established her Water Oak Plantation on the remaining  naming it for the antebellum plantation belonging to Richard H. Bradford.

References

 Through Some Eventful Years
Rootsweb Plantations
Largest Slaveholders from 1860 Slave Census Schedules

Plantations in Leon County, Florida
Cotton plantations in Florida